

Albums

Studio albums

Compilations

Live albums

Soundtracks

Limited editions

Box sets

Spoken word

Extended plays

Singles

Videos

Video albums

Other appearances
1995: Duny by Jiří Korn
1996: Citová investice by Petr Hapka and Michal Horáček 
2001: Mohlo by tu být líp by Petr Hapka and Michal Horáček (on "Unesený" and "Okna dokořán")
2008: Kouzelné Vánoce - with Boni Pueri and Karel Gott (#8)
2009: Kouzelné Vánoce II - with Boni Pueri (#20, 5 weeks on the chart)
 Soukromé poselství – with Komorní filharmonie Pardubice
 Znamení by České srdce (on "Bosou nohou žárem")

See also
 The 100 Greatest Slovak Albums of All Time

References 

General

Specific

External links

 LucieBila.com (official website)
 EMImusic.cz (record label)
 

 Lucie Bílá at Billboard
 Lucie Bílá on Discogs
 

Pop music discographies